Pra Jiad is a type of armband worn by Muay Thai athletes. In the past, their use was to give confidence and luck to the athletes, and was usually made by the fighter's close family member (mother, father, etc.).  Some fighters wear one Pra Jiad, some wear two.  Some schools also use color-coded pra  to show rank, similar to belts in karate.  Today, some gyms will give Pra Jiad to their athletes to boost their confidence.  

Traditionally, pra  were kept in high or well revered places, as it was thought that if someone stepped over it, or dropped it, it would lose its mystical power.

Origin of the Pra Jiad
The origin of the Pra Jiad has close association with warriors going into the battlefield.  In the past, Thai warriors would be given a piece of their mother’s clothing before leaving their home for battles. They tied the pieces of clothing around their arms to bring them good luck in battle so that they would return home safely.
Muay Thai
Kickboxing terminology
Armbands